Danish Lutheran Church is located in Alta, Iowa, United States.  The first meeting of the Danish Lutheran church society was held on February 22, 1880 with 42 people as charter members.  They built this Gothic Revival church building in 1887.  It measures , and cost a $1,000 to build.  The Rev. Amos Johnson served as the congregation's first pastor.  The church building was listed on the National Register of Historic Places in 2011.

References

Religious organizations established in 1880
Churches completed in 1887
Lutheran churches in Iowa
Gothic Revival church buildings in Iowa
National Register of Historic Places in Buena Vista County, Iowa
Churches on the National Register of Historic Places in Iowa
Danish-American culture in Iowa